Miami International Holdings, Inc. (MIH) is an American company formed in 2007 that operates global financial exchanges and execution services. The company owns several U.S. exchanges for equities, equity options, and commodities. These include the MIAX Exchange Group — which is composed of MIAX, MIAX Pearl, MIAX Pearl Equities, and MIAX Emerald — and the Minneapolis Grain Exchange (MGEX). It also owns the Bermuda Stock Exchange and Dorman Trading, a Futures Commission Merchant. MIH also has a subsidiary, Miami International Technologies, which is focused on the sale and licensing of trading technology developed by MIAX Exchange Group.

History
MIH launched the Miami International Securities Exchange (MIAX) in 2012, after receiving approval from the U.S. Securities and Exchange Commission (SEC).

In 2019, MIH acquired a majority stake in the Bermuda Stock Exchange.

The company received approval from the SEC and launched MIAX Pearl Equities, MIH's first equities exchange, in 2020. MIAX Pearl Equities received backing and support from member firms such as IMC Financial Markets, Susquehanna International Group, Two Sigma Investments, Hudson River Trading, and Chicago Trading Company. The exchange also became a participant in the UTP Plan.

In 2022, MIH acquired Dorman Trading, a full-service Futures Commission Merchant registered with the Commodity Futures Trading Commission. Subsequently, the company filed for a U.S. initial public offering with the SEC. MIH reported that its equities exchange, MIAX Pearl Equities, reached a record market share of 1.42% on April 27, 2022.

Awards
In 2023, MIAX was named the "Best Trading Platform" at the Fund Intelligence Operations and Services Awards and selected as one of 40 organizations in the inaugural TabbFORUM's NOVA Awards.

See also
 Minneapolis Grain Exchange
 Unlisted Trading Privileges
 Options Price Reporting Authority
 List of stock exchanges in the Americas

References

External links
 

Electronic trading platforms
Stock exchanges in the United States
Companies based in Princeton, New Jersey